Samson Mwaluda is a retired Kenyan Anglican bishop. He  served as Bishop of Taita–Taveta for 23 years.

Mwaluda was educated at Oak Hill College and the Trinity School for Ministry. Since retiring as a diocesan bishop he has been Director of GAFCON Bishops Training Institute.

References

20th-century Anglican bishops of the Anglican Church of Kenya
21st-century Anglican bishops of the Anglican Church of Kenya
Anglican bishops of Taita–Taveta
Living people
Trinity School for Ministry alumni
Alumni of Oak Hill College
Year of birth missing (living people)